Gradski stadion Lapad (0 is a football stadium located in Dubrovnik, Croatia. It was built in 1919 and serves as home stadium for NK GOŠK Dubrovnik football club. The stadium has a capacity of 3,000 spectators.

Lapad
NK GOŠK Dubrovnik
Sport in Dubrovnik